Ilvanaq (also Romanized as Īlvānaq; also known as ‘Eynālābād) is a village in Khanandabil-e Sharqi Rural District, in the Central District of Khalkhal County, Ardabil Province, Iran. At the 2006 census, its population was 259, in 61 families.

References 

Tageo

Towns and villages in Khalkhal County